Henry Poole  (28 January 1873 — 15 August 1928) was a British architectural sculptor.

He studied at the Lambeth School of Art in 1888; and from 26 January 1892 under Harry Bates ARA and George Frederic Watts RA at the Royal Academy Schools. Poole was elected ARA 22 April 1920 and became a full RA in 1927, shortly before his death. He exhibited at the Royal Academy between 1894 – 1928; and was Master of the Sculpture School from 1921 to 1927.

He worked for the army school of camouflage founded by Solomon Joseph Solomon, at Hyde Park during World War I.

Much of his architectural work has disappeared with the demolition of the buildings it decorated, but some examples survive. The celebrated bronze lions commissioned to guard The Bund entrance of The Hong Kong and Shanghai Banking Corporation's magnificent 1923 Shanghai office, still survive in the Shanghai History Museum. These were cast by J W Singer & Sons, in Frome, and modern replicas sit in their place outside the building on The Bund.

His statue of Edward VII, outside the Victoria Rooms in Bristol is another bronze survivor. As is the Statue of Captain Albert Ball, VC, DSO**, MC, the World War I fighter ace, in the grounds of Nottingham Castle.

Carved stone works survive at Cardiff City Hall (Giraldus Cambrensis), Deptford Town Hall and Westminster Central Hall.

Works
Deptford Town Hall (1903) 
Westminster Central Hall (1905–1911)
Charity, sculpture group above the entrance to the former Bethnal Green Town Hall, (1910)
Colnaghi's, New Bond Street (1912)
Relief panels for the Public Library and Baths, Great Smith Street, (1892–1893)
Edward VII statue and memorial fountains, with Edwin Rickards, Bristol (1912)
Equestrian statue of Field Marshal Earl Roberts VC, (1916) in Kelvingrove Park, Glasgow, after an original design by Harry Bates
Sculptures for the Chapel of St Michael and St George, St Paul's Cathedral
Interior decoration of The Black Friar public house, Queen Victoria Street, London
Statue of Captain Albert Ball, Nottingham Castle (1921)
War memorial, Evesham, Worcestershire (1921)
War memorial, Pudsey, West Yorks (1922)
War memorial, Wotton-under-Edge, Gloucestershire (1920)
Chatham Naval Memorial, Kent, with Sir Robert Lorimer, (1924)
Plymouth Naval Memorial with Sir Robert Lorimer, (1924)
Portsmouth Naval Memorial, Southsea Common, with Sir Robert Lorimer,  (1924)
Nottingham High School war memorial

References

External links

1873 births
1928 deaths
British architectural sculptors
20th-century British sculptors
Alumni of the Lambeth School of Art
Alumni of the Royal Academy Schools
Royal Academicians